Judenbüchel is a Jewish cemetery in Cologne, Germany.

References

Cemeteries in Cologne